Thundering Caravans is a 1952 American Western film directed by Harry Keller and starring Allan Lane, Mona Knox and Eddy Waller.

The film's art direction was by Frank Hotaling.

Plot

Cast
 Allan Lane as Marshal Rocky Lane  
 Black Jack as Black Jack  
 Eddy Waller as Sheriff Nugget Clark  
 Mona Knox as Alice Scott  
 Roy Barcroft as Ed Brill  
 Isabel Randolph as Deborah Cranston  
 Richard Crane as Deputy Dan Reed  
 William Henry as Bert Cranston  
 Edward Clark as Printer Tom  
 Pierre Watkin as Head Marshal  
 Stanley Andrews as Henry Scott 
 Boyd 'Red' Morgan as Henchman Joe 
 Fred Aldrich as Townsman  
 Art Dillard as Henchman  
 Roy Engel as Frank  
 Marshall Reed as Wounded Driver  
 Tex Terry as Rogers  
 Dale Van Sickel as Cave Henchman

References

Bibliography
 Bernard A. Drew. Motion Picture Series and Sequels: A Reference Guide. Routledge, 2013.

External links
 

1952 films
1952 Western (genre) films
American Western (genre) films
Films directed by Harry Keller
Republic Pictures films
American black-and-white films
1950s English-language films
1950s American films